Anichini is a quite common Florentine surname from Annichini di Bongarden, Deutch "Freelance Mercenary" in 1300, and may refer to:

Assunta Anichini, Florentine children's clothing tailored brand
Luigi Anichini, Ferrara  engraver
Cezary Anichini (1787-1861), Polish-Italian architect

Italian-language surnames